Trapped Animal is the third and final studio album by English punk band the Slits. It was released on 6 October 2009, and was their first album since their 2006 reunion which initially resulted in the EP Revenge of the Killer Slits. Founding vocalist Ari Up and bassist Tessa Pollitt returned, although the rest of the band underwent significant lineup changes introducing Hollie Cook on backing vocals, Adele Wilson on guitar, Little Anna (Anna Ozawa) on keyboards and melodica (her original song 'Be It' included) and Anna Schulte on drums.  Trapped Animal received mixed to negative reviews from critics upon release. The Slits continued to tour the album until the following year when Up died after a two year battle with breast cancer, causing the band to disband permanently.

Track listing
"Ask Ma"
"Lazy Slam"
"Pay Rent"
"Reject"
"Trapped Animals"
"Issues"
"Peer Pressure"
"Partner from Hell"
"Babylon"
"Cry Baby"
"Reggae Gypsy"
"Be It"
"Can't Relate"
"Had a Day"

References

2009 albums
The Slits albums
Albums produced by Adrian Sherwood